Bokusan Nishiari, was a prominent Japanese Sōtō Zen Buddhist monk during the Meiji Era. He is considered one of the most influential Sōtō priests of the modern era due to his elevation of the status of the school's founder Eihei Dōgen, the many prominent positions he held during his lifetime, and his almost equally prolific disciples Sōtan Oka and Ian Kishizawa. Nishiari's positions included abbot of Sōtō's head temple Sōji-ji, professor at what would become Komazawa University, and chief priest, or kanchō, of the entire Sōtō school. His student Sōtan Oka was the first abbot of Antai-ji and a teacher to both Kōdō Sawaki and Hashimoto Ekō, each of whom are the source of Zen lineages in the United States. His student Ian Kishizawa taught Shunryū Suzuki, the founder of the San Francisco Zen Center. Though critical of Nishiari later in his life, the founder of the Sanbō Kyōdan sect Hakuun Yasutani also studied extensively with him and Kishizawa. The Buddhist studies scholar William Bodiford writes of Nishiari:

References

Zen Buddhist abbots
Soto Zen Buddhists
1821 births
1910 deaths
Buddhism in the Meiji period
Japanese Zen Buddhists
People from Aomori Prefecture
People from Hachinohe